The following outline is provided as an overview of and topical guide to Dresden:

Dresden – capital and the most populated city in the German state of Saxony. With over 547,172 residents in 328.8 km2 (127.0 sq mi) it is also Germany's twelfth largest Großstadt. Dresden is one of the most visited cities in Germany.

General reference 
 Pronunciation: ;
 Common English name(s): Dresden
 Official English name(s): City of Dresden
 Adjectival(s): Dresdener
 Demonym(s): Dresdener

Geography of Dresden 

Geography of Dresden
 Dresden is:
 a city
 capital of Saxony
 Population of Dresden: 547,172
 Area of Dresden: 328.8 km2 (127.0 sq mi) 
 Atlas of Dresden

Location of Dresden 

Dresden is situated within the following regions:
 Northern Hemisphere and Eastern Hemisphere
 Eurasia
 Europe (outline)
 Central Europe
 Germany (outline)
 Saxony
 Time zone(s): 
 Central European Time (UTC+01)
 In Summer (DST): Central European Summer Time (UTC+02)

Environment of Dresden 

 Climate of Dresden

Landforms of Dresden 

Geography and urban development of Dresden
 Highlands in Dresden
 Schönfeld Upland
 Rivers in Dresden
 Elbe
 Landgraben
 Weißeritz
 Valleys in Dresden
 Dresden Elbe Valley
Dresden Basin

Areas of Dresden

Districts of Dresden 

 Löbtau
 Gorbitz

Neighborhoods in Dresden 

 
 Albertstadt
 Äußere Neustadt
 Blasewitz
 Buehlau
 Friedrichstadt
 Hellerau
 Innere Neustadt
 Loschwitz
 Mickten
 Neumarkt
 Pillnitz

Locations in Dresden 

 Tourist attractions in Dresden
 Shopping areas and markets
 Striezelmarkt
 World Heritage sites in Dresden

Bridges in Dresden 

 Augustus Bridge
 Loschwitz Bridge
 Waldschlösschen Bridge

Castles in Dresden 

 Dresden Castle
 Dresden Armoury
 Fürstenzug
 Kupferstich-Kabinett
 Münzkabinett

Cultural and exhibition centres in Dresden 

 Transparent Factory

Monuments and memorials in Dresden 

 Busmannkapelle Memorial

Museums and art galleries in Dresden 

 Albertinum
Skulpturensammlung
 Bundeswehr Military History Museum
 Dresden City Art Gallery
 Dresden City Museum
 Dresden Museum of Ethnology
 Dresden Transport Museum
 Galerie Neue Meister
 Gemäldegalerie Alte Meister
 German Hygiene Museum
 Grünes Gewölbe
 Semper Gallery
 State Museum of Zoology

Palaces and villas in Dresden 

 Albrechtsberg Palace
 Japanisches Palais
 Kaiserpalast
 Palais Flemming-Sulkowski
 Pillnitz Castle
 Wackerbarth-Palais
 Zwinger
Dresden Porcelain Collection
Mathematisch-Physikalischer Salon

Parks and gardens in Dresden 

 Großer Garten
 Dresden Botanical Garden
 Dresden Zoo

Public squares in Dresden 

 Pirnaischer Platz
 Schillerplatz
 Schloßplatz
 Wasaplatz

Religious buildings in Dresden 

 Church of Reconciliation
 Dresden Cathedral
 Dresden Frauenkirche
 Himmelfahrtskirche
 Kreuzkirche
 New Synagogue
 Semper Synagogue
 St. Simeon of the Wonderful Mountain Church
 Trinitatiskirche
 Zionskirche

Secular buildings in Dresden 

 Johanneum
 Landhaus
 Dresden Panometer
 Orpheum Dresden
 Sächsische Staatskanzlei
 Sächsisches Ständehaus
 Saxon Landtag
 Saxon State and University Library Dresden
Deutsche Fotothek
 Taschenbergpalais
 Yenidze

Streets in Dresden 

 Brühl's Terrace

Theatres in Dresden 

 Festspielhaus Hellerau
 Opernhaus am Taschenberg
 Opernhaus am Zwinger
 Semperoper
 Societaetstheater
 Staatsschauspiel Dresden

Towers in Dresden 

 Dresden TV tower

Demographics of Dresden 

Demographics of Dresden

Government and politics of Dresden 

Government and politics of Dresden
 City Council of Dresden
 Mayors of Dresden
 International relations of Dresden
 Sister cities of Dresden
  Saint Petersburg, Russia, since 1961
  Florence, Tuscany, Italy, since 1978
  Hamburg, Germany, since 1987
  Salzburg, Austria, since 1991

History of Dresden 
History of Dresden

History of Dresden, by period or event 

Timeline of Dresden

 Early history
 Kingdom of Saxony – Dresden becomes the capital of the Kingdom of Saxony (1806–1918)
 Battle of Dresden (1813)
 May Uprising in Dresden (1849)
 Free State of Saxony – Dresden becomes the capital of the first Free State of Saxony (1918–1934)
 Dresden during the Second World War
 Bombing of Dresden in World War II
 Dresden post-reunification

History of Dresden, by subject 

 Dresden Conference (1851)
 Siege of Dresden
 Treaty of Dresden

Culture of Dresden 

 

Culture of Dresden
 Events in Dresden
 Annual events in Dresden
Elbhangfest
Striezelmarkt
 Festivals in Dresden
 Bunte Republik Neustadt
 Dresden Music Festival
 Internationales Dixieland Festival Dresden
 Jazztage Dresden
 Languages in Dresden
 Upper Saxon German
 Upper Sorbian language
 Media in Dresden
 Newspapers in Dresden
Dresdner Neueste Nachrichten
Sächsische Zeitung
 Radio and television in Dresden
Dresden Fernsehen
Mitteldeutscher Rundfunk
 Recreation in Dresden
 Dresden Elbe Valley
 Dresden Heath
 Saxon Switzerland

Arts in Dresden

Architecture of Dresden 

Architecture of Dresden
 Dresden school

Cinema of Dresden 

Cinema of Dresden

Music of Dresden 

Music of Dresden

 Music schools in Dresden
 Hochschule für Musik Carl Maria von Weber
 Music venues in Dresden
 Semperoper
 Musical compositions written or adapted for Dresden:
 Kyrie–Gloria Mass in B minor, BWV 232 I (1733), by Johann Sebastian Bach.
 Missa Sanctissimae Trinitatis, ZWV 17 (1736), and Missa Votiva, ZWV 18 (1739), by Jan Dismas Zelenka.
 Musical ensembles in Dresden 
 Dresden Philharmonic
 Dresdner Kammerchor
 Dresdner Kreuzchor
 Staatskapelle Dresden

Visual arts of Dresden 

 Die Brücke
Dresden in art / Paintings of Dresden
 Dresden From the Right Bank of the Elbe Above the Augustus Bridge

Cuisine of Dresden 

Cuisine of Dresden
 Dresdner Stollen

People of Dresden 

 People from Dresden

Religion in Dresden 
 Catholicism in Dresden
 Roman Catholic Diocese of Dresden-Meissen
 Bishop of Dresden

Sports in Dresden 

Sports in Dresden
 Basketball in Dresden
 Dresden Titans
 Football in Dresden
 Dynamo Dresden
List of Dynamo Dresden players
List of Dynamo Dresden seasons
 Ice hockey in Dresden
 Dresdner Eislöwen
 Sport venues in Dresden
 EnergieVerbund Arena
 Heinz-Steyer-Stadion
 Ostragehege
 Stadion Dresden

Economy and infrastructure of Dresden 

Economy of Dresden
 Banking in Dresden
 Dresdner Bank
 Ostsächsische Sparkasse Dresden
 Industry in Dresden
 Enterprises in Dresden
 Tourism in Dresden
 Tourist attractions in Dresden

Transport in Dresden 

Transport in Dresden
 Public transport operators 
 Dresdner Verkehrsbetriebe
 Air transport in Dresden
 Dresden Airport
Dresden Flughafen station
 Maritime transport in Dresden
 Sächsische Dampfschiffahrt
 Ferries 
Johannstadt Neustadt Ferry
Laubegast Niederpoyritz Ferry
Pillnitz Kleinzschachwitz Ferry

Rail transport in Dresden 
 Dresden Funicular Railway
 Dresden Park Railway
  Dresden S-Bahn
 S-Bahn stations in the Dresden inner city
Dresden Hauptbahnhof
Dresden Mitte station
Dresden-Neustadt station
 Dresden Suspension Railway
 Trams in Dresden
CarGoTram

Road transport in Dresden 
 Roads in Dresden

Education in Dresden 

Education in Dresden

Public education in Dresden
 Secondary education in Dresden
 Dresden International School
 Institutions of higher education in Dresden
 Universities in Dresden
 Dresden Academy of Fine Arts
 TU Dresden
TU Dresden School of International Studies
 Research institutes in Dresden
Dresden High Magnetic Field Laboratory
Helmholtz-Zentrum Dresden-Rossendorf
Leibniz Institute for Polymer Research

Publications about Dresden 

 The Destruction of Dresden

See also 

 Outline of geography

References

External links 

Dresden
Dresden